Until 1 January 2007 Ledøje-Smørum was a municipality (Danish, kommune) in Copenhagen County on Zealand (Sjælland) island in eastern Denmark, then merged into Egedal.  The municipality covered an area of 31 km2 (12 mi²) and had a total population of 10,525 (2005), northwest of nearby Copenhagen.

History 
The last mayor of Ledøje-Smørum was Jens Jørgen Nygaard, a member of the Conservative People's Party (Det Konservative Folkeparti)  political party. The main town and the site of its municipal council was the town of Smørum.

 Ledøje Parish
 Smørum Parish.

Ledøje-Smørum municipality ceased to exist as the result of Kommunalreformen ("The Municipality Reform" of 2007).  It was merged with Stenløse and  Ølstykke municipalities to form the new Egedal municipality.   This created a municipality with an area of 126 km2 (49 mi²) and a total population of 39,267 (2005).  The new municipality belongs to Region Hovedstaden ("Capital Region").

References 
 Municipal statistics: NetBorger Kommunefakta, delivered from KMD aka Kommunedata (Municipal Data)
 Municipal mergers and neighbors: https://web.archive.org/web/20061208085744/http://kommune.eniro.dk/region/media/nyekommuner.shtml Eniro new municipalities map]

External links 
 Egedal municipality's official website (Danish only)

Former municipalities of Denmark